Do Dilon Ki Dastaan is a 1966 Hindi-language film starring Pradeep Kumar, Vyjayanthimala in lead roles and music by O. P. Nayyar.

Cast
Pradeep Kumar 
Vyjayanthimala
Shashikala
Rehman
Om Prakash
Nazir Hussain

Soundtrack

References

External links
 

1966 films
1960s Hindi-language films
Films scored by O. P. Nayyar